The Shaheed Nagar is a metro station located on the Red Line of the Delhi Metro. It is located in the Sahibabad Industrial Area locality of Ghaziabad of Uttar Pradesh.

History
This station opened on 8 March 2019.

Station layout

See also
List of Delhi Metro stations
Transport in Delhi
Delhi Metro Rail Corporation
Delhi Suburban Railway
List of rapid transit systems in India
Delhi Transport Corporation
List of Metro Systems
National Capital Region (India)
Ghaziabad district, Uttar Pradesh

References

External links

 Delhi Metro Rail Corporation Ltd. (Official site)
 Delhi Metro Annual Reports
 
 UrbanRail.Net – descriptions of all metro systems in the world, each with a schematic map showing all stations.

Delhi Metro stations
Railway stations in Ghaziabad district, India